Capital punishment is a legal penalty in Japan. It is applied in practice only for aggravated murder, although it is also a legal penalty for certain crimes against the state, such as treason and military insubordination, as well as kidnapping resulting in death. Executions are carried out by long drop hanging, and take place at one of the seven execution chambers located in major cities across the country.

Death sentences are usually passed in cases of multiple murders, although there have been some cases where individuals who committed a single murder have been sentenced to death and executed, such as those involving torture, or kidnapping with a demand for ransom.

Since 2000, 98 inmates have been executed in Japan, with the most recent being the execution of Tomohiro Katō, the perpetrator of the Akihabara massacre in 2008, who was executed on 26 July 2022. There are currently 106 death row inmates awaiting execution. Support for capital punishment has consistently been high among the Japanese public. In 2020, a poll conducted by the Cabinet Office revealed that more than 80% support the continued usage of the death penalty in Japan.

History

According to the Kojiki, Japan's oldest historical book, the death penalty is believed to have first appeared in Japan in the first half of the 5th century during the reign of Emperor Nintoku. Methods of execution during this period included strangulation, beheading, and burning to death, and in some special cases, the death penalty was carried out and then exposed to public view. 

The Taihō Code and the Yōrō Code stipulated two methods of capital punishment: beheading and strangulation. In 773, the method of beating to death was added for arsonists and thieves, bringing the total to three methods of capital punishment. The execution of the death penalty required the approval of the emperor.

Beginning in the Nara period (710－794), the death penalty was infrequently used, and the death penalty was abolished completely in the Heian period (794－1185). The death penalty was not used for 346 years following the execution of Fujiwara no Nakanari in 810, until it was revived during the Hōgen rebellion of 1156. However, during the Genpei War (1180－1185), the death penalty by sawing and crucifixion may have been carried out.

During the Kamakura period (1185－1333), the only method of capital punishment was beheading, and felons in particular were displayed to the public as an example after their execution. The Muromachi period (1333－1573) largely followed the Kamakura period method of capital punishment. On the other hand, seppuku, which appeared as a method of suicide in the Heian period, was first used as a method of capital punishment in this period.

From the Sengoku period to the Azuchi-Momoyama period, the methods of execution became more varied and cruel, reflecting the climate of warfare. The following methods of execution were used: skewering with a yari, burying them in the ground from the neck down and cutting off their heads with a bamboo saw, tying the criminal's legs to two oxen and tearing the legs apart, tying the criminal's legs to two wheels and tearing the legs apart, burning the criminal at the stake, boiling the criminal in a pot, wrapping the criminal in a woven straw rug and throwing him under water, and so on. During this period, capital punishment by crucifixion was also practiced, which is believed to have begun under Western influence.

In the early Edo period (1603－1867), there was no new code on capital punishment, and some of the methods of execution used in the Sengoku period, such as execution by oxen, were continued, but, in 1742, during the reign of Tokugawa Yoshimune, a new law was enacted that changed the method of capital punishment and lessened its severity. Under the new law, the only methods of capital punishment were sawing, crucifixion, beheading, burning at the stake, and seppuku. Burning at the stake applied only to arsonists, while seppuku applied only to the samurai class. Even for the same beheading, there were differences in the treatment of the body after execution, depending on the severity of the crime. If the crime was serious, the body was exposed to the public for three days, used for test cutting with a Japanese sword (tameshigiri), or had its property confiscated by the government. In the Edo period, sawing was a method of execution for criminals who had killed their lord, which was the most severe of the death penalties. The revised law by Tokugawa Yoshimune stated that the criminal should be buried in the ground from the neck down and exposed to the public for two days, and if any of the victim's relatives or passersby so requested, he or she should actually be sawed to death. After the law was revised, however, the sawing became a mere formality, and no saws were ever used in executions. In practice, the saw was placed next to the criminal, who was buried from the neck down, and exposed to the public for two days before he was finally executed by crucifixion.

In 1871 during the Meiji era (1868－1912), as the result of a major reform of the penal code, the number of crimes punishable by death was decreased and excessively harsh torture and flogging were abolished. In 1873, another revision resulted in a further reduction in the number of crimes punishable by death, and methods of execution were restricted to beheading or hanging. However, such sentiments would see a sharp reversal after World War I as the country descended into militarism up to World War II, and after the country's defeat, continuing towards post-war Japan until today. 

Today, executions in Japan are carried out by long drop hanging, which is intended to cause death by breakage of the neck.

System

Sentencing guideline – Nagayama Standard
In Japan, the courts follow guidelines laid down in the trial of Norio Nagayama, a 19-year-old from a severely disadvantaged background, who committed four separate robbery-murders in 1968 and was finally hanged in 1997. The Tokyo High Court originally gave him a life term, but, in 1983, the Supreme Court of Japan held it was an error, and quashed this sentence before sending Nagayama back on death row.

The court ruled that the penalty shall be decided in consideration of the degree of criminal liability and balance of justice based on a nine-point set of criteria. Though technically not a precedent, this guideline has been followed by all subsequent capital cases in Japan. The nine criteria are as follows:
Degree of viciousness
Motive
How the crime was committed; especially the manner in which the victim was killed.
Outcome of the crime; especially the number of victims.
Sentiments of the bereaved family members.
Impact of the crime on Japanese society.
Defendant's age (in Japan, the age of majority is 18).
Defendant's previous criminal record.
Degree of remorse shown by the defendant.

The number of victims killed is the most important criterion for imposition of a death sentence. A death sentence handed down for a single murder (previous convictions included) is considered "extraordinary".

In 2012, a research institute affiliated with the Supreme Court issued a report on application of capital punishment from 1980 to 2009. The study found that, while prosecutors very rarely demand the death penalty in cases of single murder, death sentences were passed in 32% of those cases where they requested it. On the other hand, prosecutors seek the death penalty almost systematically in cases of multiple homicide, and 59% of cases of double-murder and 79% of cases where three or more victims have been killed result in death sentences being passed.

The study also found that death sentences were passed in all cases of convicted murderers who killed again after being released on parole from life prison terms, and in all robbery-murder cases with three or more people killed.

Furthermore, in 5 of 10 kidnap-for-ransom cases in which one person was killed, the defendants were sentenced to death.

Judicial process 
Since May 2009, district courts try capital cases using the lay judge system, where three professional judges sit with six randomly chosen citizens. Five votes of nine-member court, including at least one professional judge, are required for issuing a conviction and any punishment, including death.

Japan has a civil law legal system; therefore, appeal courts retry both facts and law. High courts retry cases with only three judges and no lay judges, and can either reduce a death sentence to life or raise a life sentence to death. Ultimately, a five-member petty bench of the Supreme Court has the final say on the penalty, Article 411 of Code of Criminal Procedure allowing it to remand the case or change the punishment if the one handed down by the high court is "seriously unfair".

In only three cases since 1945 has the Supreme Court ruled a high court-imposed life sentence too lenient and ordered a retrial for death sentence. Among them are Norio Nagayama and Takayuki Fukuda, both under 20 at time of crime. The third case was that of a man convicted of murdering an elderly woman for robbery shortly after being paroled from a life sentence imposed for a similar crime.

Stays of execution 

According to Article 475 of the Japanese Code of Criminal Procedure, the death penalty must be executed within six months after the failure of the prisoner's final appeal upon an order from the Minister of Justice. However, the period requesting retrial or pardon is exempt from this regulation. Therefore, in practice, the typical stay on death row is between five and seven years; a quarter of the prisoners have been on death row for over ten years. For several, the stay has been over 30 years (Sadamichi Hirasawa died of natural causes at the age of 95, after awaiting execution for 32 years).

Death row 
Japanese death row inmates are imprisoned inside the detention centres of Tokyo, Osaka, Nagoya, Sendai, Fukuoka, Hiroshima and Sapporo. Despite having high courts, Tachikawa Detention Centre and Takamatsu Detention Centre are not equipped with execution chambers; executions administered by the Tachikawa and Takamatsu High Courts are carried out in the Tokyo and Osaka Detention Centres. Those on death row are not classified as prisoners by the Japanese justice system and the facilities in which they are incarcerated are not referred to as prisons. Inmates lack many of the rights afforded to other Japanese prisoners. The nature of the regime they live under is largely up to the director of the detention centre, but it is usually significantly harsher than normal Japanese prisons. Inmates are held in solitary confinement and are forbidden to communicate with their fellows. They are permitted two periods of exercise a week, are not allowed televisions and may only possess three books. Prison visits, both by family members and legal representatives, are infrequent and closely supervised.

As of 21 December 2021, 107 inmates currently sit on death row awaiting execution.

Execution
The execution warrant is signed by the Minister of Justice after internal consultations within the justice ministry. Once the final approval is signed, the execution will take place within five business days.

By statute, the execution cannot take place on a national holiday, Saturday, Sunday, or between 31 December and 2 January.

Executions are carried out by hanging in an execution chamber within the detention centre. When the death warrant has been signed, the condemned prisoner is informed on the morning of their execution. The condemned is given a choice of a last meal. The prisoner's family and legal representatives, and also the general public, are informed only after the execution has taken place. Since 7 December 2007, the authorities have been releasing names, natures of crime, and ages of executed prisoners.

In Japan, until the 1970s, the date of execution was announced to the condemned prisoner before the execution. However, because there were cases of death row inmates committing suicide before the execution, the method was changed to one or two hours before the execution to ensure the emotional stability of the inmate.

The method of hanging is the long drop, causing instant unconsciousness and rapid death by neck fracture.

Death sentences for minors
Having signed both the Convention on the Rights of the Child and the International Covenant on Civil and Political Rights, which forbid any executions for those under the age of 18, Japan sets the minimum age for capital punishment at 18 (Juvenile Law § 51). Although death sentences for minors (defined in Japan as those under age 20) are rare, those who commit capital crimes at age 18 or 19 may be legally sentenced to death.

Nine juvenile criminals have received death sentences that were finalised since 1966: Misao Katagiri, Kiyoshi Watanabe, Mitsuo Sasanuma, Fumio Matsuki, Sumio Kanno, Tsuneo Kuroiwa, Norio Nagayama, Teruhiko Seki and Takayuki Mizujiri. Eight of them have already been executed and Watanabe, who killed four people when he was 19 years old, remains on death row awaiting execution.

, the most recent juvenile death sentence was given to Takayuki Fukuda, passed by the Hiroshima High Court on 22 April 2008, and upheld by the Supreme Court on 20 February 2012. A month after his 18th birthday, he killed and then raped a woman, along with murdering her baby.

Public debate 
The Japanese public has generally supported the death penalty. The government regularly monitors support for the death penalty, the last survey, in 2020, showing that more than 80% of the public believed the death penalty to be "permissible"; and only about 8% said that it should be abolished. This was a minimal change to the previous survey conducted in 2015, which also showed that 80.3% of the public believed the death penalty to be "permissible". At a 2003 trial, a Tokyo prosecutor presented the court a petition with 76,000 signatures as part of his case for a death sentence. 

During the late 1980s, four death penalty defendants who were sentenced in the period just after World War II were exonerated by the Supreme Court. Charles Lane of The Washington Post claims that this embarrassed the Ministry of Justice, whose officials sincerely believed that such mistakes by the system were almost impossible. Between 1989 and 1993, four successive ministers of justice refused to authorise executions, which amounted to an informal moratorium.

The British newspaper The Times claimed that the death penalty was "effectively suspended" on 17 September 2009 with the appointment of Keiko Chiba, who was a member of anti-death penalty MPs caucus group, as Minister of Justice. However, no official policy statement was made in this regard. Chiba only stated that "I will cautiously handle (the cases) based on the duties of the justice minister." The Times''' speculation was conclusively disproven when Chiba signed two death warrants and personally witnessed their executions.

 Support 
Supporters say that capital punishment is justified and only to those who have committed the most extreme of crimes — a single murder is not considered to warrant a death sentence unless there are additional aggravating circumstances, such as rape or robbery. In the 1956 debate, Japanese serial killer Genzo Kurita, who engaged in rape and necrophilia, was cited by the Diet as an example of a murderer whose crimes were atrocious enough to merit death. However, it is more the rarity of extreme crimes in Japanese society rather than an unwillingness of the authorities to carry out executions that has caused so few executions to take place.

Since executions resumed in 1993, a rise in street crime during the 1990s, the sarin gas attack on the Tokyo subway in 1995 have hardened attitudes amongst the public and the judiciary. Since 1999, there have been a series of cases in which criminals sentenced to life imprisonment have been given the death penalty after prosecutors successfully appealed to high courts.

On 18 March 2009, a district court sentenced to death two men for the murder of Rie Isogai. Fumiko Isogai, who lost her only child in this crime, launched a campaign to call for the death penalty on the three murderers in September 2007. Within ten days, her petition was signed by 100,000 citizens. She presented her petition for the death penalty with some 150,000 signatures to the District Public Prosecutors' Office of Nagoya on 23 October 2007. About 318,000 citizens had signed her petition by December 2008.

Although single murderers rarely face a death sentence in Japan, Takeshi Tsuchimoto, a criminal law scholar at Hakuoh University and former prosecutor of the Supreme Public Prosecutors' Office, expected that the recent trend toward harsher punishments, backed by the growing public support for capital punishment, would encourage the court to sentence Kanda and Hori (of the Rie Isogai case) to death. Major national newspapers published editorials in support of this unorthodox judgment on the premise that capital punishment is retained. The Asahi Shimbun and the Mainichi Shimbun, both major national liberal newspapers, wrote in editorials that the general public favored the judgment, and the Nikkei lent its support to it. 

The Sankei Shimbun, a major national paper on the right, evaluated the judgement with a phrase "a natural and down-to-earth judgment of great significance". The Tokyo Shimbun expressed that capital punishment would be the inevitable sentence in consideration of the brutality of the murder and the pain that the victim's family felt. They also noted, however, that it would be difficult for citizen judges to determine whether death penalty would be appropriate in this kind of case under the lay judge system, which would be started in May 2009. Hiroshi Itakura, a criminal law scholar at Nihon University, said that this decision could be a new criterion for capital punishment under the lay judge system. However, one of the two men sentenced to death in the Isogai case had his sentence reduced to life imprisonment on appeal, and the Supreme Court refused to raise the punishment to death (but he was later sentenced to death in another murder case). The other defendant sentenced to death did not appeal and was hanged in 2015.

 Opposition 
Amnesty International argues that the Japanese justice system tends to place great reliance on confessions, even ones obtained under duress. 
According to a 2005 Amnesty International report:

Some critics claim that coerced confessions are responsible for Japan's high conviction rate; as of 2017, the conviction rate in Japan was 97.8%. Legal scholars, on the other hand, cite a low prosecution rate and a different method of calculating the conviction rate than in other countries as reasons for Japan's high conviction rate. According to them, Japanese prosecutors formally prosecute only about 8% of the cases they accept. These are the cases that prosecutors believe are certain to result in a conviction. About 60% of the cases they accept are not prosecuted, and about 30% are summarily tried and punished with fines of 1 million yen or less.

Amnesty also reports allegations of abuse of suspects during these interrogations. There are reports of physical abuse, sleep deprivation and denial of food, water and use of a toilet. One of its biggest criticisms is that inmates usually remain for years (and sometimes decades) on death row without ever actually being informed of the date of their execution prior to the date itself, so inmates suffer due to the uncertainty of not knowing whether or not any given day will be their last. According to Amnesty International, the intense and prolonged stress means many inmates on death row have poor mental health, suffering from the so-called death row phenomenon. The failure to give advanced notice of executions has been stated by the United Nations Human Rights Committee to be incompatible with articles 2, 7 and 10 of the International Covenant on Civil and Political Rights.

The Human Rights Documentation Centre says that the issuance of death warrants by the Ministry of Justice may be politically motivated. In 1997, Norio Nagayama, a prisoner who committed the first of several murders as a juvenile, was executed during the sentencing phase of "Sakakibara Seito" for the Kobe child murders, also resulting in a high-profile juvenile murder trial – an attempt, according to South Asia Human Rights Documentation Center, to show that the harshest punishment could be administered to juveniles. According to The New York Times, the execution of Tsutomu Miyazaki after the Akihabara massacre was claimed to be a similar case.

Supporters say that due to capital punishment, it acts as a deterrence which resulted in Japan having one of the lowest murder rates in the world, only after Singapore, which also practices capital punishment. A 2020 study examining the issue by the University of Chicago concluded that "neither the death sentence rate nor the execution rate has a statistically significant effect on the homicide and robbery-homicide rates" in Japan.

Executions

See also

 Criminal justice system of Japan
 Criminal punishment in Edo-period Japan
 Death by Hanging, a 1968 satirical Japanese film by Nagisa Oshima which criticizes the death penalty in Japan
 Judicial system of Japan
 Law of Japan
 Norio Nagayama
 Nobuto Hosaka
 Shizuka Kamei
 Life imprisonment in Japan

References

External links
Japan's Supreme Court jurisprudence on the death penalty :
 The Nagayama Case (1983)
 Other landmark cases : 1996 1999 2015 2015 
 David T. Johnson, "Japan’s Secretive Death Penalty Policy: Contours, Origins, Justifications, and Meanings" Asian-Pacific Law & Policy Journal, vol. 7(2006) pp. 62-124
Death Penalty Database - Japan. Academic research database on the laws, practice, and statistics of capital punishment for every death penalty country in the world. Published by the Cornell Center on the Death Penalty Worldwide. Information current as of: 12 November 2013. Retrieved 10 January 2017.

Articles
To advise lay judges, Supreme Court institute cites death penalty precedents Japan Times. Published 25 July 2012. Retrieved 21 December 2021.
A Secret Theater: Inside Japan's Capital Punishment System . Japan Society. United States-Japan Foundation Media Fellows Program 2003–2004. Retrieved 10 January 2017.
Japan's dance with the death penalty - report by Matthew Carney broadcast by ABC Radio National Sunday, 15 February 2015, which includes an interview with Iwao Hakamada who was released after 43 years on death row.
Japan executes two prisoners amid protests. The Guardian. Published 26 March 2016. Retrieved 10 January 2017.
Japan dances with the death penalty. The Japan Times. Published 2 July 2016. Retrieved 10 January 2017.
Calls to abolish death penalty grow louder in Japan. The Guardian. Published 21 September 2016. Retrieved 10 January 2017.
Questioning capital punishment. The Japan Times. Published 14 October 2016. Retrieved 10 January 2017.
Japan: Man hanged as secretive executions continue. Amnesty International''. Published 11 November 2016. Retrieved 10 January 2017.

Video
Ishida, Kaneko, Goto & Masaki: "The Quest to Scrap Japan's Death Penalty". YouTube. FCCJchannel. Foreign Correspondents' Club of Japan. Published 16 October 2014. Retrieved 21 April 2017.

 
Murder in Japan
Law of Japan
Human rights abuses in Japan